Shih-Li Kow is a Malaysian writer born in 1968.

Kow holds a degree in chemical engineering, and resides in Kuala Lumpur with her son and extended family. Her book Ripples and Other Stories was shortlisted for the 2009 Frank O'Connor International Short Story Award.

Her novel, the Sum of Our Follies, (French translation by Frederic Grellier, La Somme de nos Folies ) was awarded the 2018 Prix du Premier Roman Etranger prize.

Works
 News From Home, (Silverfish, 2007)
 Ripples and Other Stories, (Silverfish, Dec 2008)
 The Sum of Our Follies,  (Silverfish, 2014)

References
 Raman Krishnan (19 March 2009). "What do readers want?". Malay Mail.
 Intan Maizura Ahmad Kamal (28 March 2009). "Time for words". Sunday People.
  Shortlist for the 2009 Frank O'Connor Short Story Award Announced

Malaysian short story writers
1968 births
Living people
Malaysian women short story writers
English-language writers from Malaysia
20th-century Malaysian writers
21st-century Malaysian writers
20th-century Malaysian women writers
21st-century Malaysian women writers
20th-century short story writers
21st-century short story writers